Lepidocrocite (γ-FeO(OH)), also called esmeraldite or hydrohematite, is an iron oxide-hydroxide mineral. Lepidocrocite has an orthorhombic crystal structure, a hardness of 5, specific gravity of 4, a submetallic luster and a yellow-brown streak. It is red to reddish brown and forms when iron-containing substances rust underwater. Lepidocrocite is commonly found in the weathering of primary iron minerals and in iron ore deposits. It can be seen as rust scale inside old steel water pipes and water tanks.

The structure of lepidocrocite is similar to the boehmite structure found in bauxite and consists of layered iron(III) oxide octahedra bonded by hydrogen bonding via hydroxide layers. This relatively weakly bonded layering accounts for the scaley habit of the mineral.

It was first described in 1813 from the Zlaté Hory polymetallic ore deposit in Moravia, Czech Republic. The name is from the Greek lipis for scale and krokis for fibre.

References

Lepidocrocite and Boehmite Structure, Steven Dutch, 8 March 2002.

Hydroxide minerals
Iron(III) minerals
Orthorhombic minerals
Minerals in space group 63